The 1992–93 FR Yugoslavia Cup was the first season of the FR Yugoslavia's annual football cup. Red Star Belgrade has the winner of the competition, after they defeated FK Partizan.

First round

|}
Note: Roman numerals in brackets denote the league tier the clubs participated in the 1992–93 season.

Second round

|}
Note: Roman numerals in brackets denote the league tier the clubs participated in the 1992–93 season.

Quarter-finals

|}
Note: Roman numerals in brackets denote the league tier the clubs participated in the 1992–93 season.

Semi-finals

|}
Note: Roman numerals in brackets denote the league tier the clubs participated in the 1992–93 season.

Final

First leg

Second leg

1–1 on aggregate. Red Star won 5–4 on penalties.

See also
 1992–93 First League of FR Yugoslavia
 1992–93 Second League of FR Yugoslavia

References

External links
Results on RSSSF

FR Yugoslavia Cup
Cup
Yugo